The 2018–19 LSU Tigers basketball team represented Louisiana State University during the 2018–19 NCAA Division I men's basketball season. The team's head coach was Will Wade, in his second season at LSU. Tony Benford also served as interim head coach for the last regular season game, 2019 SEC men's basketball tournament and 2019 NCAA Division I men's basketball tournament. They played their home games at the Pete Maravich Assembly Center in Baton Rouge, Louisiana, as a member of the Southeastern Conference. They finished the season 28-7, 16-2 in SEC Play to finish as SEC regular season champions.. They lost in the quarterfinals of the SEC tournament to Florida. They received an at-large bid to the NCAA tournament where they defeated Yale and Maryland to advance to the Sweet Sixteen where they lost to Michigan State.

Previous season
The Tigers finished the 2017–18 season 18–15, 8–10 in SEC play to finish in a tie for ninth place. They lost in the second round of the SEC tournament to Mississippi State. The Tigers received an invitation to the National Invitation Tournament where they defeated Louisiana before losing in to Utah in the second round.

Offseason

Departures

Incoming transfers

2018 recruiting class

Roster

Schedule and results

|-
!colspan=12 style=|Non-conference regular season

|-
!colspan=12 style=| SEC regular season

|-
!colspan=12 style=| SEC Tournament

|-
!colspan=12 style=| NCAA tournament

Rankings

*AP does not release post-NCAA Tournament rankings^Coaches did not release a Week 2 poll.

References

LSU Tigers basketball seasons
Lsu
LSU
LSU
LSU